KDU may refer to
 Kristdemokratiska Ungdomsförbundet (Christian Democratic Youth), Sweden
 Kristendemokratisk Ungdom (Christian Democratic Youth), Denmark
 Christian and Democratic Union former electoral coalition, Czechoslovakia
 KDU College, Malaysia
 Skardu Airport IATA code